Oak Grove School District could refer to:

 Oak Grove School District 68 (Bartonville, Illinois), with two primary schools in Peoria County
 Oak Grove School District 68 (Lake County, Illinois), with one primary school in Oak Grove

See also
 Oak Grove School (disambiguation)
 Oak Grove School District (disambiguation)